Osmani Museum is a museum in Kotwali Thana of Sylhet, Bangladesh. The ancestors' home of Bangabir General Muhammad Ataul Gani Osmani, the Commander-in-Chief of Bangladesh Forces (12 April 1971 – 7 April 1972) has been transformed into today's famous "Osmani Museum". It is situated at the heart (Dhopa Dighir Par) of the Sylhet City Corporation area in renowned Sylhet Division of Bangladesh. It is about 12 km from the Sylhet Osmani International Airport and 3 km from the Sylhet Railway Station. Maintained and organised by the Bangladesh National Museum, this museum has been established to pay rich tribute to the great hero of Bangladesh for his outstanding accomplishments. This will surely act as a stimulus to the future generations. The foundation stone was laid on 16 February 1985 and it was inaugurated on 4 March 1987 by the then president of Bangladesh H M Ershad.

‘Nur Manzil' is by and large a tin shade building having few rooms and other amenities including an exquisite piazza in the front. One has to cross few meters from the main gate to reach the Museum. A huge portrait of the General, placed in the centre of the entrance hall greets the visitors. Receptionist welcomes the guests. One has to write name and address in the register placed in the reception. A befitting sitting place is also available in the lobby. This historic museum comprises three galleries, where personal belongings of General Osmani and a good number of historical photographs are preserved befittingly. On both western and eastern side of the building there exist two small rooms, where Assistant Keeper and Care Taker's office are situated.

Gallery 1 
The entire room has been decorated with showpieces similar to a bedroom. There are four chairs made of cane and two centre tables, one simple wardrobe and one wooden bed with two side tables. The favourite wrist watch, which General Osmani wore till the last hours of his life; military stick, two briefcases, a telephone set, number of books and used crockery, are kept on one side. The other side is decorated with an Alana, which contains two suits, two uniforms (khaki and deep green), two shirts (white and light blue), two panjabi, a brown sleeveless coat, four pairs of shoes including one military boot, a black umbrella, brown colour well decorated walking stick. A round table and a wooden book shelf with many books and magazines from home and abroad including "Who's Who in the World" (editions: 1978–1979 and 1980–1981) are placed in a corner. A man size portrait in military attire is placed on the wall along with Osmani on the lap of his beloved father and many other historical photographs are also kept for display.

Gallery 2 
Decorated as a drawing room, there are few furniture made of cane, which includes chairs – four 1 sitter, one 3 sitter, one 2 sitter, a centre table, two side tables etc. There are three showcases filled with many valuable and historical items. First one contains the badges, medals, ranks of General and the passport of General Osmani. The second one possesses the mementos, souvenirs and crests. And the third one displays number of credentials, which includes the Certificate of Independence Award – 1985 along with the invitation card and brief biography of the award winners. One card contains the autograph of Mrs. Indira Gandhi of India along with envelope sent to General Osmani. Eight huge paintings are hanged on the upper wall of the room. Numbers of historical photos are also hanged on the walls of the room. Among them the important few are; General Osmani speaking to the audiences after the ceremonial guard of honour presented by the army on the occasion of the grand arrival of Bangabandhu Sheikh Mujibur Rahman on 10 March 1971, landing at Sylhet airport in 1972, General Osmani with the sector commanders of the liberation war of Bangladesh, with acting president of Mujib Nagar government Syed Nazrul Islam, with president Justice Abu Sayeed Chowdhury, with Bangabandhu Sheikh Mujibur Rahman, with Shaheed president Ziaur Rahman, with ex president Ershad, with the martyrs family at the East Bengal Regimental Centre in 1981 etc.

Gallery 3 
A black reading table and chair, bed, prayer stand, Jaynamaz (Prayer Cloth), prayer cap etc. are lay down meticulously as exhibits. The other items include one black almirah, one fridge, dining table with six chairs, antique crockery and others. The operational map of Bangladesh (scale 1: 2,50,00), used by the General during the liberation war of Bangladesh, is also displayed in this room along with numerous credentials presented by the civil society.

Relevant information 
Osmani Museum remains open every day except Thursday. From Sunday to Wednesday the timings is from 10:30 AM to 5:30 PM. On Friday and Saturday it remains open from 3:30 PM to 5:30 PM. The museum authority celebrates the birth (1 September) and death (16 February) anniversaries of General M A G Osmani along with the independent (26 March) and victory day (16 December) at the museum premises. Total 11 hard working individuals are taking proper care of this precious establishment.

References

Further reading

External links
 O General My General – Bangabir General M A G Osmani

Museums in Bangladesh
Historic house museums in Asia
Tourist attractions in Sylhet
Buildings and structures in Sylhet
Biographical museums in Asia